\b may refer to:
 Backspace, keyboard key
 Word boundary in regular expressions